Orange oil is an essential oil produced by cells within the rind of an orange fruit (Citrus sinensis fruit). In contrast to most essential oils, it is extracted as a by-product of orange juice production by centrifugation, producing a cold-pressed oil. It is composed of mostly (greater than 90%) d-limonene, and is often used in place of pure d-limonene. D-limonene can be extracted from the oil by distillation.

Composition 
The compounds inside an orange oil vary with each different oil extraction. Composition varies as a result of regional and seasonal changes as well as the method used for extraction. Several hundred compounds have been identified with gas chromatograph-mass spectrometry. Most of the substances in the oil belong to the terpene group with limonene being the dominant one. Long chain aliphatic hydrocarbon alcohols and aldehydes like 1-octanol and octanal are second important group of substances. The presence of sinensetin, a flavone, explains the orange color.

Uses

Structural pest control 
In the United States, d-Limonene (Orange Oil) is an EPA approved and registered active ingredient in California and Florida for the extermination of drywood termites, Formosan termites, and other structural pests.  It is the active ingredient of the popular structural termiticide XT-2000. Regarded an alternative to traditional fumigation, d-Limonene orange oil is increasing in popularity as approximately 70% of modern consumers in California prefer local structural chemical injections over traditional "tenting" or fumigation.

Biological pest control
Orange oil can be used in green pesticides for biological pest control. It can exterminate or control ants and other insects by erasing their scent-pheromone trail indicators, or dissolving their exoskeleton, eliminating the infestation or disrupting re-infestation.

Orange oil is also known to be useful to control, but not exterminate, drywood termites (Incisitermes), killing only those who come into direct contact with it.

Domestic cleaning agent 
Orange oil is used as a cleaner. It is also used as an additive to certain wax finish/polish such as Howard's Feed-N-Wax Wood Polish & Conditioner.

Aromatherapy
Aromatherapy is a pseudoscience, with the purported evidence for health effects coming from preliminary research.

Hazards 
The limonene which is the main component of the oil is a mild irritant, as it dissolves protective skin oils. Commercial use of orange oil, like that found in XT-2000 requires the use of protective gloves, according to EPA approved labeling and most municipal structural pest control law such as the California Structural Pest Control Act of 2015.  Limonene and its oxidation products are skin irritants, and limonene-1,2-oxide (formed by aerial oxidation) is a known skin sensitizer. Most reported cases of irritation have involved long-term industrial exposure to the pure compound, e.g. during degreasing or the preparation of paints. However a study of patients presenting dermatitis showed that 3% were sensitized to limonene.

Limonene has been observed to cause cancer in male rats by reacting with major urinary protein α2u-globulin, which is not produced by female rats.  There is no evidence for carcinogenicity or genotoxicity in humans.  The IARC classifies d-limonene under Class 3: not classifiable as to its carcinogenicity to humans.

Limonene is also flammable.

See also
 Neroli
 Petitgrain
 Orange oil tires

References

External links 
The Effect of Citrus Oils on Fruit Flies

Orange production
Essential oils
Vegetable oils
Flavors
Plant toxin insecticides
Biological pest control